Mint Brook was a settlement in Newfoundland and Labrador near Gambo.  It is generally recognised as the first 'inland' settlement on the island and during its existence was very much a sawmill/logging community.

Populated places in Newfoundland and Labrador